Leopold Mayer (died 21 September 1914) was an Austrian swimmer. He competed in the men's one mile freestyle and the men's 250 metres starting relay at the 1906 Summer Olympics. He was killed in action during World War I.

See also
 List of Olympians killed in World War I

References

Year of birth missing
Place of birth missing
1914 deaths
Austrian male freestyle swimmers
Olympic swimmers of Austria
Swimmers at the 1906 Intercalated Games
Austro-Hungarian military personnel killed in World War I